Capone is an Italian surname. Notable people with the surname include:

Family of Al Capone
 Al Capone (1899–1947), prominent Chicago gangster from the 1920s
 Albert Francis Capone (1918–2004), also known as Sonny, son of Al Capone
 Frank Capone (1895–1924), Chicago mobster, brother of Al Capone
 James Vincenzo Capone (1892–1952), legally changed his name to Richard James Hart after the First World War, oldest brother of Al Capone
 Ralph Capone (1894–1974), Chicago mobster, brother of Al Capone
 Mae Capone (1897–1986), wife and widow of Al Capone

Other Capones
 Andrea Capone (born 1981), Italian football midfielder
 Alessandro Capone (director) (born 1955), Italian film director and screenwriter
 Carlo Capone, Italian rally racing driver
 Claudio Capone (1952–2008), Italian film and television program narrator
 Julie St. Claire (born/credited Juliette Capone), American film celebrity
 Loredana Capone (born 1951), president of the Regional Council of Apulia
 Louis Capone (1896–1944), New York mobster
 Tom Capone (1966–2004), born Luiz Antonio Ferreira Gonçalves, Brazilian music producer and guitarist
 Tomer Capone (born 1985), Israeli actor
 Warren Capone (born 1951), American football linebacker

See also
Kapone, surname

Italian-language surnames